Vlad Hagiu (born 29 March 1963) is a Romanian coach and former water polo player who competed in the 1996 Summer Olympics.

Achievements

Player
Dinamo Bucharest
Romanian Superliga: 1979, 1980, 1982, 1983, 1984, 1987, 1988, 1989, 1990, 1997 
LEN Cup Winners' Cup runner-up: 1986

Romania
European Water Polo Championship: 4th place: 1993

Individual
Top Scorer of the 1991 World Championship: 25 goals.

Head coach
Romania
European Water Polo Championship: 4th place: 2006

Steaua Bucharest
Romanian Cup: 2009

References

1963 births
Living people
Water polo players from Bucharest
Romanian male water polo players
Romanian water polo coaches
Romanian expatriate sportspeople in Italy
Romanian expatriate sportspeople in Germany
Universiade medalists in water polo
Universiade bronze medalists for Romania
Olympic water polo players of Romania
Water polo players at the 1996 Summer Olympics